Major-General Eric Paytherus Nares CBE MC & Bar (9 July 1892 – 18 June 1947) was a senior officer of the British Army.

Military career
Born the youngest son of Ramsey Nares and educated at Marlborough College and the Royal Military College, Sandhurst, Eric Nares was commissioned into the Cheshire Regiment on 20 September 1911. Among his fellow graduates were two future generals, Kenneth Anderson and Montagu Stopford.

He served in World War I and was wounded twice, three times mentioned in dispatches and was awarded the Military Cross (MC) with a bar. The citation for his MC reads:

The bar to his MC reads:

After the war he served with the West African Frontier Force until 1924. He attended, from 1927 to 1928, the Staff College, Camberley, and later became a staff captain in China in 1931 and was made assistant adjutant and quartermaster general (AA&QMG) for the 8th Division in Palestine, during the Arab revolt, in 1936.

The theatres where he served in World War II included the Middle East, North Africa and Central Mediterranean including Italy.  His World War II service was recognized by the crown when he was appointed a Commander of the Order of the British Empire (CBE).  Later, his service in Italy, from January to November 1944, earned him the Legion of Merit (Degree of Commander) from President Harry Truman in 1946. His last post was Commandant of the British Sector in Berlin after the war.

He died in London, on 18 June 1947 at Queen Alexandra's Military Hospital. He was later cremated after a service at St Thomas-on-the-Bourne, Farnham, Surrey. A memorial tablet for him was dedicated to him by his fellow officers in the sanctuary of the regimental chapel in Chester Cathedral.

Family
He was married to Jeanne Hubertine from the Netherlands, but she died shortly after contracting sandfly fever after she accompanied him to Palestine.

References

Bibliography

External links

Generals of World War II

 

1892 births
1947 deaths
British Army major generals
British Army generals of World War II
British Army personnel of World War I
British military personnel of the 1936–1939 Arab revolt in Palestine
Cheshire Regiment officers
Commanders of the Legion of Merit
Commanders of the Order of the British Empire
Deaths from lung cancer
Graduates of the Royal Military College, Sandhurst
Graduates of the Staff College, Camberley
People educated at Marlborough College
Recipients of the Military Cross
Royal West African Frontier Force officers